This is a list of auto racing tracks in Mexico. The number of turns and track length are based on the standard, full courses for each track. The major series in bold listed are currently hold a race at the track.

Ovals

Road courses

Temporary circuits

Drag strips

By state

 
Mexico tracksa
Mexico
Mexico sport-related lists